William Hugh Alan Cooper  (2 June 1909 – 14 October 1999) was an eminent Anglican bishop whose ecclesiastical career spanned nearly 50 years in the twentieth century.

Educated at King's College School and Christ's College, Cambridge and ordained in 1932, he began his career with  curacies at St Margaret, Blackheath and Holy Trinity, Cambridge. He was a CMS Missionary in Lagos and then held incumbencies at St Giles, Ashtead and of St Andrew, Plymouth before becoming Provost of Bradford, a post he held from 1962 to 1977. He was then an Assistant Bishop in Karachi for three years.

References

1909 births
1999 deaths
People educated at King's College School, London
Alumni of Christ's College, Cambridge
Provosts and Deans of Bradford